"This Man... This Monster!" is a Fantastic Four story co-plotted by Stan Lee and Jack Kirby, written by Lee, drawn by Kirby and published by Marvel Comics. The story appears in Fantastic Four #51.

Plot
Roaming the streets, Benjamin Grimm, the Thing, is offered a place to stay by a man who has become very interested in him. While Ben sleeps, the man uses a device to transfer the Thing's powers to himself and goes to the Baxter Building, posing as the Thing, in hopes of eliminating Reed Richards, based on the misconception that Reed makes his discoveries for the glory.

When Ben wakes up to realizes that his powers are gone, he tries to warn Reed Richards that the "Thing" who is with him is an impostor (Ricardo Jones, a man who hated Reed). However, they believe that Ben himself is the impostor, and dismiss him from the Baxter Building. Meanwhile, at Metro University, Johnny Storm and Wyatt Wingfoot get involved in a squabble with football star Whitey Mullins, but it is broken up by Coach Thorne, who, when realizing that Wyatt's father used to play on the Metro U. football team, offers him a position, which Wyatt refuses.

While back at the Baxter Building, Reed tests out his newest invention: A portal to the Negative Zone. Traveling in this anti-matter universe, he has the "Thing" hold the tether so that he is not lost in the realm. When the tether breaks, the Thing impostor, having realized how selfless Richards is, changes his opinion of him, and jumps into the Negative Zone portal to save him. He then throws Reed back through the portal into the positive matter universe, leaving himself to perish at the energy barrier that separates the positive and negative matter universes.

Meanwhile, the human Ben Grimm is about to visit Alicia to show her that he is back to normal and propose to her. However, he knocks on the door just at the exact moment when his impostor dies. Suddenly transformed back into the Thing, he flees the scene and returns to the Baxter Building. There, Reed and Sue realize that the friend they were just mourning is actually still alive and well, and that the impostor who was posing as him—whoever he was—had died a man.

Reception
Writer Peter David uses "This Man... This Monster!" to exemplify plot structure in a comic book in his book Writing for Comics with Peter David.

Comics Should Be Good ranked Fantastic Four #51 as the most iconic Thing cover.

Legacy
The graphic novel Fantastic Four Full Circle by Alex Ross reintroduces Ricardo Jones as a memory, after his corpse is transported back into the Baxter Building.

References

External links
 Fantastic Four (1961) - #51 "This Man... This Monster!"  at the Comic Book DB

1966 in comics
1966 comics debuts
Comics by Jack Kirby
Comics by Stan Lee
Single issue storylines of comic book series